Roseyka (Roseyka; , Rasseyka) is a health-spa zone within the territory of Prymorske, Bilhorod-Dnistrovskyi Raion, Odessa Oblast, Ukraine.

Resorts
More than 50 guest-houses are located within the territory of Roseyka.  The resort  is connected to the shore of the Black Sea by wooden bridges across the lake.

References

Tourist attractions in Odesa Oblast
Bilhorod-Dnistrovskyi Raion